The Ministry of Urban Development, Government of India, and the Central Pollution Control Board (CPCB) of India, annually publish National City Rating under the Swachh Bharat Abhiyan scheme. The rating includes around 500 cities, covering 72 percent of the urban population in India.

Until 2017, India was divided into five zones for the purpose of this survey and each city was scored on 19 indicators. The cities were classified into four colours: green, blue, black, and red, green being the cleanest city, and red the most polluted. None of the cities was rated as green—the best category in the exercise. However, during the 2017-18 senses survey, the parameters of assessment were modified, and cities were categorised, based on population, into metropolis, large, medium, and small cities, and assessment took place according to this categorisation.

The latest ranking of 2022 by the cleanliness survey Swachh Survekshan marks Indore as the cleanest city of India. Indore has held the title of being India's cleanest city for six consecutive years.

Summary 
The Ministry of Housing & Urban Affairs ranks cities based on cleanliness index. This list summarises the cities topping those lists annually.

2022 
Swachh Sarvekshan 2022 

Top 20 cleanest cities in India over 1 million population

1) Indore

2) Surat

3) Navi Mumbai

4) Vishakhapatnam

5) Vijayawada

6) Bhopal

7) Rajkot

8) Ahmedabad

9) Pune

10) Hyderabad

11) Raipur

12) Ghaziabad

13) Thane

14) Vadodara

15) Meerut

16) Prayagraj

17) Lucknow

18) Gwalior

19) Pimpri-Chinchwad

20) Nashik

2021 

Top 10 cleanest cities in the Swachh Survekshan 2021 for over 1 million Population

1) Indore

2) Surat

3) Vijayawada

4) Navi Mumbai

5) Pune

6) Raipur

7) Bhopal

8) Vadodara

9) Visakhapatnam

10) Ahmedabad

2019-2020 
The results of the fifth edition of the nationwide annual cleanliness survey, 'Swachh Survekshan 2020,' are out and Madhya Pradesh's Indore has yet again made it as India's cleanest city. Gujarat's Surat emerged as India’s second cleanest city, followed by Navi Mumbai which bagged the third spot in Ministry of Housing and Urban Affairs' swachhta city survey report.

Swachh Survekshan 2020 covered 4,242 cities, 62 cantonment boards and 92 Ganga towns. This survey was carried out in 28 days.

List of Cleanest Cities in India 2020, are as follows:

2017-2018 
The dimensions of assessment increased during the 2017–18 survey, identifying cities and states to excel in different aspects of environment, energy, and cleanliness.

2016–2017 
Swachh Survekshan 2017 was an extensive sanitation survey across 500 cities in India. The Ministry of Urban Development commissioned Quality Council of India to conduct this survey; to check the progress and impact of Swachh Bharat Abhiyan launched in 2014. It aims to foster a spirit of competition among the cities and offers a comprehensive assessment of their sanitation status.

The performance of each city was evaluated on five key thematic parameters-

Swachh Sarvekshan 2017 was conducted between 4 January 2017 and 7 February 2017. The results of top 30 cities are as follows:

2015–2016 
The Union Ministry of Urban Development commissioned an extensive survey to study the progress of Prime Minister Narendra Modi's Swachh Bharat Mission and to rank 73 cities on sanitation and cleanliness. The survey, the first for the Swachh Bharat Mission, was conducted by the Quality Council of India (QCI) and was named Swachh Sarvekshan. It covered all state capitals and another 53 cities with a population of above one million. It involved three streams of data collection - interaction with municipal body, direct observation and citizen feedback. Swachh Sarvekshan evaluated the work done in the following six measurable aspects of sanitation and hygiene:

Swachh Sarvekshan 2016 was conducted between 5 January 2016 and 20 January 2016. The Results, as per the latest available sources, are as follows:

2014–2015

According to the Central Pollution Control Board (CPCB) India, in 2015 it conducted a survey of the least polluted cities in India as well, ranked based on air quality. Among the least-polluted cities are Pathanamthitta, Mangalore, Wayanad, Hassan, and Palakkad. The table below shows the ranking of these cities as per the PM10 content in the air.

2009–2010

See also
 Swachh Bharat Abhiyan
 Central Pollution Control Board

References

Urban development in India
Cleanest